Anhembi orthobunyavirus, also called Anhembi virus (AMBV), is a species of virus.  It was initially considered a strain of Wyeomyia virus, belonging serologically to the Bunyamwera serogroup of bunyaviruses.  In 2018 it was made its own species.  It was isolated from the rodent - Proechimys iheringi - and a mosquito - Phoniomyia pilicauda - in São Paulo, Brazil. 

Until 2001 this virus has not been reported to cause disease in humans.

References 

Orthobunyaviruses